Byala Slatina is a town in Northwestern Bulgaria. It is located in Vratsa Province. As of December 2016, the town has a population of 10,282 inhabitants.

It is the seat of Byala Slatina Municipality.

History 
The first hospital in the village was opened in 1889. In 1904 the village of Byala Slatina became a town. Ilia Kalkanov is the mayor in which the settlement becomes a town.

At the outbreak of the Balkan War in 1912, three people from Byala Slatina were volunteers in the Macedonian-Adrianople Corps. Byala Slatina was declared a town by a decree of King Ferdinand on June 27, 1914.

References

External links
 Official site

Towns in Bulgaria
Populated places in Vratsa Province